Blayton may refer to:

Betty Blayton (1937–2016), American activist, advocate, artist, arts administrator, educator, lecturer
J. Blaine Blayton (1905–2002), African-American physician in the Williamsburg, Virginia, area
Jesse B. Blayton (1897–1977), radio entrepreneur, civil rights activist, professor, accountant, businessman

See also
J. Blaine Blayton Elementary School, southeastern Virginia
Blaton
Blaydon
Blyton